Fikret Abdić (born 29 September 1939) is a Bosnian politician and businessman who first rose to prominence in the 1980s for his role in turning the Velika Kladuša-based agriculture company Agrokomerc into one of the biggest conglomerates in SFR Yugoslavia. He won the popular vote in the Bosnian presidential elections of 1990.

In the early 1990s, during the Bosnian War, Abdić declared his opposition to the official Bosnian government, and established the Autonomous Province of Western Bosnia, a small and short-lived province in the northwestern corner of Bosnia and Herzegovina composed of the town of Velika Kladuša and nearby villages.

The mini-state existed between 1993 and 1995 and was allied with the Army of Republika Srpska. In 2002, he was convicted on charges of war crimes against Bosniaks loyal to the Bosnian government by a court in Croatia and sentenced to 20 years imprisonment, which was later reduced on appeal to 15 years by the Supreme Court of Croatia.

On 9 March 2012, he was released after having served two thirds of his reduced sentence. He was imprisoned again in June 2020 on suspicion of abuse of his office as Mayor.

Early life
Fikret Abdić was born in the village of Donja Vidovska, Velika Kladuša, Kingdom of Yugoslavia on 29 September 1939.

Early career
Before the war, Abdić was the director of Agrokomerc, a company based in Velika Kladuša that he raised from a small agricultural cooperative into a modern food combine which employed over 13,000 workers, and which boosted the economy of the entire area.

Agrokomerc transformed Velika Kladuša from a poverty-struck region to a regional powerhouse. Local residents of Velika Kladuša reportedly called him Babo (Daddy).

He ran the company with strong political backing from influential politician Hamdija Pozderac and his brother, Hakija.

In late 1987, just before the death of Hamdija Pozderac, Raif Dizdarević was about to take over the annual Presidency of Yugoslavia, during which a scandal arose. Abdić found himself imprisoned for alleged financial improprieties, and Hamdija Pozderac resigned. The scandal shook not only the Socialist Republic of Bosnia and Herzegovina, but the whole of Yugoslavia. Another of his controversial moves was erecting a monument to an Ottoman Bosnian başbölükbaşı, Mujo Hrnjica, on a hill above Velika Kladuša.

After his release from prison, he made a last-minute decision to join the Party of Democratic Action and run for the Presidency of Bosnia and Herzegovina in the 1990 elections. Under the constitution, voters elected seven members to the presidency: two Bosniaks, two Serbs, two Croats, and one Yugoslav.

He and his future rival Alija Izetbegović ran for the two Bosniak positions, and were both elected. Once the positions were filled, the members of the presidency elected a President of the Presidency who acted as its head. Abdić won more popular votes than Izetbegović, but did not assume office for reasons which remain unknown to the public.

Bosnian War

According to NIN, Abdić briefly appeared in Sarajevo when the Bosnian War broke out, hoping to assume the presidency after Izetbegović had been arrested by the Yugoslav People's Army (JNA). However, he was preempted by Izetbegović having already named Ejup Ganić for that position.

A few months later, Abdić decided to return to Bihać, where he was well known locally as an opponent of Izetbegović's government. Using his expansive network of business connections, Abdić was able to keep the city supplied with consumer goods such as cigarettes, coffee and detergent, even as it was under siege by Serb forces. This gained Abdić so much popularity among the city's inhabitants that in 1993 he was able to reincorporate Bihać and its surroundings as the Autonomous Province of Western Bosnia (APZB) and install himself as governor. Though characterised as treasonous by the Bosnian government, Abdić's fiefdom was recognized by Croat and Serb leaders, who were happy to weaken the Bosnian government in light of the Milošević–Tuđman Karađorđevo meeting and the Graz agreement that aimed to partition Bosnia and Herzegovina between Croatia and Serbia.

Abdić established prison camps for those who fought for the Bosnian government. Detainees at the camps were subjected to killings, torture, sexual assaults, beatings and other cruel and inhumane treatment. In addition to Abdić's paramilitary forces, a paramilitary unit from Serbia known as the Scorpions participated in the war crimes on Bosniaks.

During Operation Tiger '94, the 5th Corps of Army of Republic of Bosnia and Herzegovina (ARBiH), based in the south part of the Bihać pocket in western Bosnia militarily defeated Western Bosnia. Abdić, however, raised an army which was supplied, trained, financed by (and fought alongside) the Army of Republika Srpska (VRS) and used Serbian counterintelligence against the ARBiH and Bosniaks loyal to Izetbegović and was able to successfully reinstate Western Bosnia during Operation Spider. The Serbs took advantage of the situation and strengthened their and Abdić's positions. In August 1995, an ARBiH offensive part of Operation Storm ended the APZB forcing him to flee to Croatia.

Lord Owen, a British diplomat and co-author of the Vance-Owen and Owen-Stoltenberg peace plans described Abdić as "forthright, confident and different from the Sarajevan Muslims. He was in favour of negotiating and compromising with Croats and Serbs to achieve a settlement, and scathing about those Muslims who wanted to block any such settlement."

After the war
After the war he was granted political asylum and citizenship by the Croatian President Franjo Tuđman, and lived near Rijeka. The government of Bosnia and Herzegovina charged him with the deaths of 121 civilians, three POWs and the wounding of 400 civilians at Bihać. Croatia refused, however, to extradite him. After Tuđman's death in 1999, and the change in government in Croatia the following year, Croatian authorities arrested and tried him. In 2002, he was sentenced to 20 years in prison for war crimes committed in the area of the "Bihać pocket". In 2005, the Croatian Supreme Court reduced the sentence to 15 years. He was released from prison on 8 March 2012, after serving ten of his 15-years sentence, from the minimum security prison in Pula, whereupon he was greeted by thousands of joyful supporters who had been bused in from Velika Kladuša.

Abdić ran for the position of Bosniak member of the Bosnian presidency in 2002 on the Democratic People's Community party ticket in 2002 and won 4.1% of the vote. Bosnian law does not bar him from running for office since his conviction is in Croatia.

Abdić was LS BiH's candidate for the mayor of Velika Kladuša in the 2016 Bosnian municipal elections. He received 9,026 votes, or 48.10%, and was elected as the new mayor. In June 2020 he was arrested by Bosnia's federal police as part of a corruption investigation which included a number of municipal officials. He was put in pre-trial detention, but was released in late October after his lawyers petitioned the court to allow him to take part in the re-election campaign for the 2020 Bosnian municipal elections in November that year, which he narrowly won with 44.1 percent of the vote. In March 2021 prosecutors formally indicted Abdić and six other municipal officials on charges of graft related to procurement tenders.

See also
Elvira Abdić-Jelenović

References

External links

Aubrey Verboven's book Border Crossings - An Aid Worker's Journey into Bosnia provides an extremely detailed depiction of life in Velika Kladuša and the Batnoga refugee camp in 1994–95. It also bears witness to the concentration camp inhabitants and Serbian paramilitaries who roamed Velika Kladuša during that time.

1939 births
Living people
Bosniaks of Bosnia and Herzegovina
Bosniaks of Croatia 
Bosnia and Herzegovina Muslims
People from Velika Kladuša
Croatian Muslims  
Bosniaks of Bosnia and Herzegovina convicted of war crimes
Bosnia and Herzegovina people imprisoned abroad
Prisoners and detainees of Croatia 
Politicians of the Bosnian War
Politicians convicted of crimes
Warlords
Naturalized citizens of Croatia
Democratic People's Union politicians
Members of the Presidency of Bosnia and Herzegovina